Punk Goes 90s Vol. 2 is the fifteenth compilation album in the Punk Goes... series and the second installment in the Punk Goes '90s series, the first being released in 2006. Each artist that appeared on the album was approached by Fearless Records to cover a song from the 1990s.

Background and release
The album was announced by Fearless Records through a video teaser, posted on January 1, 2014, which also revealed that the first single from the album, to be released on January 7, would be Get Scared's cover of "My Own Worst Enemy" by Lit. It was announced on February 6 that the album would be released on April 1 the same year; the album's full track listing and artwork were released on the same day.

The next song released from the album was Asking Alexandria's cover of Nine Inch Nails' song "Closer", released on February 25. In March it was revealed that rock band Mayday Parade had been recording a music video for their cover of "Comedown" by Bush. The song itself was released on March 18, accompanied by its lyric video.

The album was officially released on April 1, along with the release of Chunk! No, Captain Chunk!'s music video for "All Star", originally by Smash Mouth. Smash Mouth themselves praised the band's cover and stated that they were excited for the new album. Music videos for Hands Like Houses' cover of "Torn" (Ednaswap) and Falling in Reverse's "Gangsta's Paradise" (Coolio) were also released.

Asking Alexandria chose to cover "Closer" due to its "gritty, dirty" sound. Guitarist Ben Bruce explained "Growing up in the '90s means that all of us have a soft spot for '90s jams from the weird and wonderful, to the cheesy boy bands to the dirty and grungy!" Falling in Reverse's cover of "Gangsta's Paradise" featured Ronnie Radke rapping.

Japan additionally received a second disk of Japanese artists covering American 90's songs. Artists featured included Artema, Before My Life Fails, Cleave, Fear From The Hate, A Ghost of Flare, Her Name In Blood, Lost, Make My Day, The Winking Owl, キバオブアキバ and ヒステリックパニック.

Critical reception
Brian Kraus of the Alternative Press stated that not one song from the album sounded like it was recorded in the 1990s, going on to say that Chunk! No, Captain Chunk!'s "All Star" was one of the highlights of the album, despite it being "corny". He also praised The Color Morale's approach to the Foo Fighters song "Everlong" and gave the album 3/5 stars overall, stating "Vol. 2 is worth a visit, because with covers, sometimes even the trainwrecks are entertaining."

Track listing

Japanese Edition
The Japan Edition contained a second CD which included 11 tracks by various Japanese bands covering American songs from the 1990s.

Sampler Track listing
Punk Goes 90s Vol. 2 also included a bonus sampler CD with every physical copy of the album when bought through Alternative Press. The sampler CD contains 10 previous released songs by bands from the Fearless Records label.

Charts and release history
Charts

Releases

References

Covers albums
Punk Goes series
2014 compilation albums